The Twin-spot Goby, or Crab-eyed Goby, (Signigobius biocellatus) is a species of goby native to the Western Pacific Ocean where they can be found in areas of sand, silt in lagoons, or coastal bays with nearby cover such as rubble, coral, or leaf litter. This species can reach a length of  SL. It can also be found in the aquarium trade. It is currently the only known member of its genus.

References

External links
 

Gobiinae
Fish described in 1977
Monotypic fish genera